The Association of Monterey Bay Area Governments (AMBAG) is a regional governmental organization which consists of representation of a large number of public agencies within Monterey County, Santa Cruz County and San Benito County, California. AMBAG has a broad charter of research and governmental oversight for a variety of functions including elements of land planning, natural resource conservation, energy, transportation, and economic development. The following governmental entities are members of AMBAG:

Counties
Monterey County
San Benito County
Santa Cruz County

Cities

In Monterey County
Carmel-by the-Sea
Del Rey Oaks
Gonzales
Greenfield
King City
Marina
Monterey
Pacific Grove
Salinas
Sand City
Seaside
Soledad

In San Benito County
Hollister
San Juan Bautista

In Santa Cruz County
Capitola
Santa Cruz
Scotts Valley
Watsonville

References

External links
AMBAG official site

Local government in California
Government of Monterey County, California
Government of San Benito County, California
Government of Santa Cruz County, California
Monterey Bay
Organizations based in California